Peripheral membrane proteins, or extrinsic membrane proteins, are membrane proteins that adhere only temporarily to the biological membrane with which they are associated. These proteins attach to integral membrane proteins, or penetrate the peripheral regions of the lipid bilayer. The regulatory protein subunits of many ion channels and transmembrane receptors, for example, may be defined as peripheral membrane proteins. In contrast to integral membrane proteins, peripheral membrane proteins tend to collect in the water-soluble component, or fraction, of all the proteins extracted during a protein purification procedure. Proteins with GPI anchors are an exception to this rule and can have purification properties similar to those of integral membrane proteins.

The reversible attachment of proteins to biological membranes has shown to regulate cell signaling and many other important cellular events, through a variety of mechanisms. For example, the close association between many enzymes and biological membranes may bring them into close proximity with their lipid substrate(s). Membrane binding may also promote rearrangement, dissociation, or conformational changes within many protein structural domains, resulting in an activation  of their biological activity. Additionally, the positioning of many proteins are localized to either the inner or outer surfaces or leaflets of their resident membrane.
This facilitates the assembly of multi-protein complexes by increasing the probability of any appropriate protein–protein interactions.

Binding to the lipid bilayer

Peripheral membrane proteins may interact with other proteins or directly with the lipid bilayer. In the latter case, they are then known as amphitropic proteins.
Some proteins, such as G-proteins and certain protein kinases, interact with transmembrane proteins and the lipid bilayer simultaneously. Some polypeptide hormones, antimicrobial peptides, and neurotoxins accumulate at the membrane surface prior to locating and interacting with their cell surface receptor targets, which may themselves be peripheral membrane proteins. 

The phospholipid bilayer that forms the cell surface membrane consists of a hydrophobic inner core region sandwiched between two regions of hydrophilicity, one at the inner surface and one at the outer surface of the cell membrane (see lipid bilayer article for a more detailed structural description of the cell membrane). The inner and outer surfaces, or interfacial regions, of model phospholipid bilayers have been shown to have a thickness of around 8 to 10 Å, although this may be wider in biological membranes that include large amounts of gangliosides or lipopolysaccharides.
The hydrophobic inner core region of typical biological membranes may have a thickness of around 27 to 32 Å, as estimated by Small angle X-ray scattering (SAXS).
The boundary region between the hydrophobic inner core and the hydrophilic interfacial regions is very narrow, at around 3 Å, (see lipid bilayer article for a description of its component chemical groups). Moving outwards away from the hydrophobic core region and into the interfacial hydrophilic region, the effective concentration of water rapidly changes across this boundary layer, from nearly zero to a concentration of around 2 M.
The phosphate groups within phospholipid bilayers are fully hydrated or saturated with water and are situated around 5 Å outside the boundary of the hydrophobic core region.

Some water-soluble proteins associate with lipid bilayers irreversibly and can form transmembrane alpha-helical or beta-barrel channels. Such transformations occur in pore forming toxins such as colicin A, alpha-hemolysin, and others. They may also occur in BcL-2 like protein , in some amphiphilic antimicrobial peptides , and in certain annexins . These proteins are usually described as peripheral as one of their conformational states is water-soluble or only loosely associated with a membrane.

Membrane binding mechanisms

The association of a protein with a lipid bilayer may involve significant changes within tertiary structure of a protein. These may include the folding of regions of protein structure that were previously unfolded  or a re-arrangement in the folding or a refolding of the membrane-associated part of the proteins. It also may involve the formation or dissociation of protein quaternary structures or oligomeric complexes, and specific binding of ions, ligands, or regulatory lipids. 

Typical amphitropic proteins must interact strongly with the lipid bilayer in order to perform their biological functions.  These include the enzymatic processing of lipids and other hydrophobic substances, membrane anchoring, and the binding and transfer of small nonpolar compounds between different cellular membranes. These proteins may be anchored to the bilayer as a result of hydrophobic interactions between the bilayer and exposed nonpolar residues at the surface of a protein,  by specific non-covalent binding interactions with regulatory lipids , or through their attachment to covalently bound lipid anchors. 

It has been shown that the membrane binding affinities of many peripheral proteins depend on the specific lipid composition of the membrane with which they are associated.

Non-specific hydrophobic association
Amphitropic proteins associate with lipid bilayers via various hydrophobic anchor structures. Such as amphiphilic α-helixes, exposed nonpolar loops, post-translationally acylated or lipidated amino acid residues, or acyl chains of specifically bound regulatory lipids such as phosphatidylinositol phosphates. Hydrophobic interactions have been shown to be important even for highly cationic peptides and proteins, such as the polybasic domain of the MARCKS protein or histactophilin, when their natural hydrophobic anchors are present.

Covalently bound lipid anchors
Lipid anchored proteins are covalently attached to different fatty acid acyl chains on the cytoplasmic side of the cell membrane via palmitoylation, myristoylation, or prenylation. On the exoplasmic face of the cell membrane, lipid anchored proteins are covalently attached to the lipids glycosylphosphatidylinositol (GPI) and cholesterol. Protein association with membranes through the use of acylated residues is a reversible process, as the acyl chain can be buried in a protein's hydrophobic binding pocket after dissociation from the membrane. This process occurs within the beta-subunits of G-proteins. Perhaps because of this additional need for structural flexibility, lipid anchors are usually bound to the highly flexible segments of proteins tertiary structure that are not well resolved by protein crystallographic studies.

Specific protein–lipid binding

Some cytosolic proteins are recruited to different cellular membranes by recognizing certain types of lipid found within a given membrane. Binding of a protein to a specific lipid occurs via specific membrane-targeting structural domains that occur within the protein and have specific binding pockets for the lipid head groups of the lipids to which they bind. This is a typical biochemical protein–ligand interaction, and is stabilized by the formation of intermolecular hydrogen bonds, van der Waals interactions, and hydrophobic interactions between the protein and lipid ligand. Such complexes are also stabilized by the formation of ionic bridges between the aspartate or glutamate residues of the protein and lipid phosphates via intervening calcium ions (Ca2+). Such ionic bridges can occur and are stable when ions (such as Ca2+) are already bound to a protein in solution, prior to lipid binding. The formation of ionic bridges is seen in the protein–lipid interaction between both protein C2 type domains and annexins..

Protein–lipid electrostatic interactions
Any positively charged protein will be attracted to a negatively charged membrane by nonspecific electrostatic interactions. However, not all peripheral peptides and proteins are cationic, and only certain sides of membrane are negatively charged. These include the cytoplasmic side of plasma membranes, the outer leaflet of outer bacterial membranes and mitochondrial membranes. Therefore, electrostatic interactions play an important role in membrane targeting of electron carriers such as cytochrome c, cationic toxins such as charybdotoxin, and specific membrane-targeting domains such as some PH domains, C1 domains, and C2 domains.

Electrostatic interactions are strongly dependent on the ionic strength of the solution. These interactions are relatively weak at the physiological ionic strength (0.14M NaCl): ~3 to 4 kcal/mol for small cationic proteins, such as cytochrome c, charybdotoxin or hisactophilin.

Spatial position in membrane
Orientations and penetration depths of many amphitropic proteins and peptides in membranes are studied using site-directed spin labeling, chemical labeling, measurement of membrane binding affinities of protein mutants, fluorescence spectroscopy, solution or solid-state NMR spectroscopy,
ATR FTIR spectroscopy, X-ray or neutron diffraction, and computational methods.

Two distinct membrane-association modes of proteins have been identified. Typical water-soluble proteins have no exposed nonpolar residues or any other hydrophobic anchors. Therefore, they remain completely in aqueous solution and do not penetrate into the lipid bilayer, which would be energetically costly. Such proteins interact with bilayers only electrostatically, for example, ribonuclease and poly-lysine interact with membranes in this mode. However, typical amphitropic proteins have various hydrophobic anchors that penetrate the interfacial region and reach the hydrocarbon interior of the membrane. Such proteins "deform" the lipid bilayer, decreasing the temperature of lipid fluid-gel transition. The binding is usually a strongly exothermic reaction. Association of amphiphilic α-helices with membranes occurs similarly. Intrinsically unstructured or unfolded peptides with nonpolar residues or lipid anchors can also penetrate the interfacial region of the membrane and reach the hydrocarbon core, especially when such peptides are cationic and interact with negatively charged membranes.

Categories

Enzymes
Peripheral enzymes participate in metabolism of different membrane components, such as lipids (phospholipases and cholesterol oxidases), cell wall oligosaccharides (glycosyltransferase and transglycosidases), or proteins (signal peptidase and palmitoyl protein thioesterases). Lipases can also digest lipids that form micelles or nonpolar droplets in water.

Membrane-targeting domains (“lipid clamps")

Membrane-targeting domains associate specifically with head groups of their lipid ligands embedded into the membrane. These lipid ligands are present in different concentrations in distinct types of biological membranes (for example, PtdIns3P can be found mostly in membranes of early endosomes, PtdIns(3,5)P2 in late endosomes, and PtdIns4P in the Golgi). Hence, each domain is targeted to a specific membrane.
C1 domains  bind diacylglycerol and phorbol esters.
C2 domains  bind phosphatidylserine, phosphatidylcholine or PtdIns(3,4)P2 or PtdIns(4,5)P2.
Pleckstrin homology domains , PX domains , and Tubby domains  bind different phosphoinositides
FYVE domains  are more specific for PtdIns3P.
ENTH domains  bind PtdIns(3,4)P2 or PtdIns(4,5)P2.
ANTH domain  binds PtdIns(4,5)P2.
Proteins from ERM (ezrin/radixin/moesin) family  bind PtdIns(4,5)P2.
Other phosphoinositide-binding proteins include phosphotyrosine-binding domain  and certain PDZ domains. They bind PtdIns(4,5)P2.
Discoidin domains of blood coagulation factors 
ENTH, VHS and ANTH domains

Structural domains
Structural domains mediate attachment of other proteins to membranes. Their binding to membranes can be mediated by calcium ions (Ca2+) that form bridges between the acidic protein residues and phosphate groups of lipids, as in annexins or GLA domains.

Transporters of small hydrophobic molecules
These peripheral proteins function as carriers of non-polar compounds between different types of cell membranes or between membranes and cytosolic protein complexes. The transported substances are phosphatidylinositol, tocopherol, gangliosides, glycolipids, sterol derivatives, retinol, fatty acids, water, macromolecules, red blood cells, phospholipids, and nucleotides.
Glycolipid transfer proteins
Lipocalins including retinol binding proteins and fatty acid-binding proteins
Polyisoprenoid-binding protein, such as YceI protein domain
Ganglioside GM2 activator proteins
CRAL-TRIO domain (α-Tocopherol and phosphatidylinositol sec14p transfer proteins)
Sterol carrier proteins
Phosphatidylinositol transfer proteins and STAR domains
Oxysterol-binding protein

Electron carriers
These proteins are involved in electron transport chains. They include cytochrome c, cupredoxins, high potential iron protein, adrenodoxin reductase, some flavoproteins, and others.

Polypeptide hormones, toxins, and antimicrobial peptides
Many hormones, toxins, inhibitors, or antimicrobial peptides interact specifically with transmembrane protein complexes. They can also accumulate at the lipid bilayer surface, prior to binding their protein targets. Such polypeptide ligands are often positively charged and interact electrostatically with anionic membranes.

Some water-soluble proteins and peptides can also form transmembrane channels. They usually undergo oligomerization, significant conformational changes, and associate with membranes irreversibly. 3D structure of one such transmembrane channel, α-hemolysin, has been determined. In other cases, the experimental structure represents a water-soluble conformation that interacts with the lipid bilayer peripherally, although some of the channel-forming peptides are rather hydrophobic and therefore were studied by NMR spectroscopy in organic solvents or in the presence of micelles.

See also
 Antimicrobial peptides
 Lipoproteins
 Membrane proteins
 Transmembrane proteins

References

General references

Seaton B.A. and Roberts M.F. Peripheral membrane proteins. pp. 355–403. In Biological Membranes (Eds. K. Mertz and B.Roux), Birkhauser Boston, 1996.
Benga G. Protein-lipid interactions in biological membranes, pp. 159–188. In Structure and Properties of Biological Membranes, vol. 1 (Ed. G. Benga) Boca Raton CRC Press, 1985.
Kessel A. and Ben-Tal N. 2002. Free energy determinants of peptide association with lipid bilayers. In Current Topics in Membranes 52: 205–253.

External links
Peripheral membrane proteins in OPM database
DOLOP Genomics-oriented database of bacterial lipoproteins
Peptaibol database
Antimicrobial Peptide Database 

Peripheral membrane proteins